This is a list of seasons completed by the New York Dragons. The Dragons were a professional arena football franchise of the Arena Football League (AFL), based in Uniondale, New York. The team was established in 1995 as the Iowa Barnstormers. As the Barnstormers, the franchise made the playoffs in all but one season, and appeared in two consecutive ArenaBowls, however lost both. Before the 2001 season, the Barnstormers relocated to New York and changed their name to the Dragons. As they did in Iowa, the Dragons won four division championships, but have not been in any ArenaBowls. In the 2004 season, the Dragons won their division, but did not qualify for the playoffs due to a rule change made prior to that season concerning which teams would be given a playoff berth. The rule was changed back following that season's conclusion to the way it was before 2004. Prior to the 2009 season, the AFL announced that it had suspended operations indefinitely and canceled the 2009 season. The Dragons played their home games at Nassau Veterans Memorial Coliseum.

Notes
 The Dragons finished in first place and won the division championship, but did not qualify for the playoffs because the AFL changed the playoff format for that season, with only the top eight teams league-wide being awarded a playoff berth. There was no guaranteed playoff berth for division winners, and the Dragons were not one of the top eight teams, therefore they did not participate in the playoffs. The AFL went back to the old rule in the following season that gave an automatic playoff berth to any team that won its division.

References
General
 
 

Specific

Arena Football League seasons by team
New York Dragons seasons
Iowa sports-related lists
New York (state) sports-related lists